Claude "Steel Arm" Dickey (June 2, 1896 – March 11, 1923) was a Negro leagues pitcher for the first Negro Southern League and  Negro National League. Researchers currently believe his real name is Claude Dickey, based on census records and World War I draft registration cards. Newspaper reports show he appears as Walter Claude, John Claude, and Jean Claude. Many reports simply call him Steel Arm Dickey.

Dickey had a short career, dying at the age of 26 in Etowah, Tennessee.

According to his death certificate, Dickey was killed after he was shot by a pistol. News reports later noted Dickey was killed by a knife. Either way, the medical examiner noted he died from a loss of blood, that he was wounded in the neck, and there was extensive damage to his esophagus. He also ruled the death a homicide. The informant appears to be a family member, Martin Dickey.

Dickey was buried in the New Zion Cemetery in Etowah, Tennessee.

References

External links
 and Seamheads

St. Louis Stars (baseball) players
1896 births
1923 deaths
Baseball players from Georgia (U.S. state)
People from Etowah, Tennessee
Baseball pitchers
Montgomery Grey Sox players
20th-century African-American sportspeople
People murdered in Tennessee